Dédé-Makouba is a sub-prefecture in the Central African Republic.

History  
In 2002, the locality becomes chief town of one of the seven sub-prefectures of Mambéré-Kadeï, resulting from a division of the sub-prefecture of Gamboula.

Administration 
The sub-prefecture consists of the only commune of Upper Kadéï .  The locality of Dédé Makouba counts 7 650 inhabitants in September 2014, including 350 displaced persons.

References 

Sub-prefectures of the Central African Republic
Populated places in the Central African Republic